The Tsiv-Gombori or Gombori (გომბორი) is a mountain range in the Georgian section of Greater Caucasus mountains. It is located in the province of Kakheti, eastern Georgia, and stretches to the distance of 107 km, with the highest mountain being at 1,991 m above sea level. 

The Gombori range serves as a watershed, separating the Alazani and Iori river valleys, thereby dividing Kakheti into two traditional regions: inner (Shida) and outer (Gare). The slopes of the range are traversed by several smaller river gorges. The Alazani passes through the mountain range affecting the overall climatic conditions in the region. Mariamjvari Strict Nature Reserve is located in the southern side of the range. Both northern and southern slopes are home to pine forests.

See also

 Caucasus Mountains
 Telavi

References

Mountain ranges of the Caucasus
Mountain ranges of Georgia (country)
Physiographic provinces